The First Siege of Veracruz was a military encounter of the Reform War which took place around Veracruz, Mexico in 1859. Conservative President Miguel Miramon attempted to besiege the Liberal capital, Veracruz, but was slowed by guerrilla attacks and forced to withdraw when he received news that a Liberal army was marching on Mexico City. Miramon would try again one year later with similar results in the Second Siege of Veracruz.

References

Conflicts in 1860
1860 in Mexico
History of Mexico
Reform War